"Pop 101" is a song recorded by Canadian pop rock band Marianas Trench, featuring hip hop artist Anami Vice. Written and produced by lead singer Josh Ramsay, it was released July 29, 2014 through 604 Records, Cherrytree Records, and Interscope Records. Originally announced as the lead single off the band's forthcoming fourth studio album, Astoria (2015), the song was later scrapped from the album and serves only as a buzz single; it is also included on their 2015 extended play, Something Old / Something New. "Pop 101" entered the Canadian Hot 100 at No. 27, and was certified Gold by Music Canada in November 2014.

Content
"Pop 101" is primarily a pop song with influences of pop rock, but also features allusions to hip hop, EDM, and folk music. The song is satirical in nature, scrutinizing the music industry and particularly the trends and clichés of modern pop music. Ryan McNutt of AUX.TV found the song to be "oddly compelling" given writer/producer Josh Ramsay's own formulaic work and success with "Call Me Maybe" (2011).

Music video
The video for "Pop 101" was directed by Kyle Davison and parodies music video tropes and current trends of celebrity culture, including house parties, twerking and harems. It premiered August 1, 2014 exclusively on MuchMusic before being uploaded to the group's official VEVO page on August 4.

Chart performance
"Pop 101" debuted at No. 27 on the Billboard Canadian Hot 100 on the chart dated August 16, 2014.

Certifications

References

2014 songs
2014 singles
604 Records singles
Songs written by Josh Ramsay
Cherrytree Records singles
Marianas Trench (band) songs